Tennis Wales is the national governing body for tennis in Wales. It is part of the British tennis governing body, the Lawn Tennis Association. It was founded as the Welsh Lawn Tennis Association (WLTA) in 1887.

History
In December 1873, Major Walter Clopton Wingfield designed an hourglass-shaped tennis court in order to obtain a patent on his court (as the rectangular court was already in use and was unpatentable). A temporary patent on this hourglass-shaped court was granted to him in February 1874, which he never renewed when it expired in 1877. 

Wingfield claimed that he had invented his version of the game for the amusement of his guests at a weekend garden party on his estate of Nantclwyd Hall, in Llanelidan, North Wales in 1874. He had likely based his game on real tennis. 

The first known records of organised tennis in Wales occurred in 1879, when the Newport Athletic Club mentions the formation of a tennis section affiliated to the club. In 1890 those records also mention the building of a covered court. 

Some of earliest known clubs to have been established in Wales were, the Teifiside LTC (f.1879) at Newcastle Emlyn, where it staged a Teifiside LTC Championship. Tenby LTC, (f.1881) at Tenby later organised the first version of South Wales Championships, but that tournament was changed to the West Wales Championships. In North Wales the Vale of Clywd LTC (f.1881) at Denbigh organised Vale of Clwyd CLTC Open Tournament (that later became the North Wales Counties Challenge Cup from 1883 till 1884), this tournament was later revived into the North Wales Championships at Criccieth.

In 1882 the Pensarn LTC in Abergele organised the North of Wales Open tournament till around 1895. Back in South Wales the Penarth LTC, Penarth held its first championships in 1885, and the Roath LTC founded in Roath about the same time, the latter later altered its name to the Cardiff Racquet and Lawn Tennis Club, and moved location to Cardiff Castle. In 1886 the first national open tennis tournament was established the Welsh Championships. In 1887 the first Welsh Lawn Tennis Association (WLTA) was founded, one year before the Lawn Tennis Association (f,1888), and eight years before the Scottish Lawn Tennis Association (f.1895).

In 1888 an annual inter-club competition, devised on a knock-out basis was established. In 1894 the Criccieth LTC at Criccieth revived the North Wales Championships until 1939. In 1893 the first national indoor tournament was established at the Craigside Hydro in Llandudno called the Welsh Covered Court Championships that ran until 1955.  In 1903 the format annual inter-club competition was changed to a club league system. In 1905 the South Wales and Monmouthshire Championships at Newport. In 1908 the Dinas Powys LTC, Dinas Powys was established and held its first tournament known as the Dinas Powys Whitsun Open. 

In 1911 Dinas Powys LTC organised the first Glamorganshire Championships.  In 1922 Llanelli LTC established the Carmarthenshire Championships. In 1923 the first Welsh Junior Championships were established. In 1925 the North Wales Lawn Tennis Association (NWLTA) was founded, and in 1961 the Mid Wales Lawn Tennis Association (MWLTA) was formed. During World War II most official records of the Welsh LTA were lost. From 1968 until 1974 indoor international tennis tournaments returned to Wales with the staging of the Dewar Cup Aberavon and Dewar Cup Cardiff events that were part of the national Dewar Cup circuit. 

In 2009 Tennis Wales had 98 affiliated clubs, who have just under 12,000 members between them. Tennis Wales organises junior, open and veterans' tournaments, including local and regional leagues—North Wales and South Wales—and county teams.

Until 2013 Tennis Wales was based at the Welsh National Tennis Centre, East Moors, Cardiff. Despite protests, the Centre was closed at short notice by its operator Virgin Active, and its future remains in doubt. Tennis Wales has a regional office in Wrexham.

Governance
Tennis Wales is governed by a board of directors who review, monitor and support the strategic direction of the Organisation via the Chief Executive. The Tennis Wales Board has ultimate responsibility of the affairs on the Company Tennis Wales Ltd and ensuring the Company is managed efficiently, effectively and in line with the requirements of the law, the Rules of LTA, to consider the requirements of the LTA and Sport Wales, and the functions laid out in the Company’s Articles of Association.

Board Of Directors
As of 2023 included: 
 Amanda Sater, Baroness Sater - President
 Neil O'Doherty - Independent Chair
 Simon Johnson - CEO
 Janet Evans - Company Secretary
 Patsy Roseblade - Independent Member
 James Armstrong - Independent Member
 Hannah Ward - Independent Member
 Lucy Scott - Board Member (North)
 Michael Gibson - Board Member (North)
 Sophie Hughes - Board Member (South)
 Bethan Lewis - Board Member (South)
 Anthony Phillips – Board Member (South)
 Nigel Osborne – Board Member (South)
 Simon Clarke - LTA Councillor
 Lucy Cohen - Independent Member

See also
Lawn Tennis Association
Tennis Scotland

References

External links
/Official:Tennis Wales Site

Sports governing bodies in Wales
Tennis in Wales
Wales